Palermo Anno Uno (Palermo Year One) is an Italian anti-mafia organization, based in Palermo, Sicily.  It is an umbrella organization for different NGOs opposing organized crime.

History 

Palermo Anno Uno was founded in March 1993, following the massive demonstrations all over Sicily following the murder of Giovanni Falcone in May 1992, as a mean to go from protest to proposals in the war against organized crime.

For its efforts against organized crime, it was awarded the 1996 Rafto Prize.

References 

Antimafia
History of Palermo